Neopostega asymmetra is a moth of the family Opostegidae. It is known only from the type locality, in the Atlantic coastal forest in southern Brazil.

The length of the forewings is about 3 mm. Adults are almost entirely white. Adults are on wing in January

Etymology
The species name is derived from the Greek asymmetros (without symmetry) in reference to the asymmetrical structure of the juxta in the male genitalia.

External links
A Revision of the New World Plant-Mining Moths of the Family Opostegidae (Lepidoptera: Nepticuloidea)

Opostegidae
Moths of South America
Moths described in 2007